Abdin, Idlib  is a Syrian town located in Khan Shaykhun Nahiyah in Maarrat al-Nu'man District, Idlib. According to the Syria Central Bureau of Statistics (CBS), Abdin had a population of 1,264 in the 2004 census.

References 

Populated places in Maarat al-Numan District